Maniscalco is an Italian surname. Maniscalco literally means "marshall," from medieval Latin mariscalcus, marescalcus; as such it was likely an occupational name (cf. Farrier).

Notable people

 Emanuele Maniscalco (born 1983), Italian jazz pianist, drummer and composer
 Sebastian Maniscalco, Italian-American stand-up comedian
 Fabio Maniscalco (1965 - 2008), Italian archaeologist, specialist about the protection of cultural property and essayist
 Hook n Sling (born Anthony Maniscalco)

External links
L'Italia dei cognomi Gens.labo.net
Dissemination of the surname MANISCALCO in Sicily 
Maniscalco on locatemyname.com

Surnames of Italian origin